Andries Jacobsz Stock (1580–1648) was a Baroque engraver, printmaker and illustrator.

Biography
Stock was born in Antwerp.  According to the RKD he is known for title pages, portrait prints and illustrations. He assisted Hendrik Hondius I with engraved portraits in his Effigies of 1610. In 1626 he was imprisoned in Amsterdam for counterfeiting.  He died in The Hague.

References

Andries Jacobsz. Stock on Artnet

1580 births
1648 deaths
Dutch Golden Age printmakers
Artists from Antwerp